The term Landesbühne (federal state stage) or Landestheater (federal state theatre) is added to the name of some publicly owned theatre companies in Germany and Austria. These companies have a mandate to perform in areas without public theatres. Less than half of performances usually take place at the seat of a Landesbühne, thereby distinguishing them from the so called Stadttheater (city theatre) or Staatstheater (national theatre). Legal control can lie with the respective Bundesland or a collaboration of several municipalities and local authorities. The spectrum of presented productions can be very diverse. The repertoire can include all or parts of the popular disciplines: play, musical theatre (opera, operetta, musical), ballet, and children's and youth theatre.

Germany 
List of federal state theatres in Germany.

Baden-Württemberg 

 Badische Landesbühne Bruchsal
 Württembergische Landesbühne Esslingen
 Landestheater Tübingen

Bavaria 

 
 Theater Hof
  Hollfeld
 Landestheater Niederbayern Landshut, Passau, Straubing
 Landestheater Schwaben Memmingen

Brandenburg

Hesse

Mecklenburg-Vorpommern

Niedersachsen 

  Hildesheim
  Wilhelmshaven

North Rhine-Westphalia 

 Grenzlandtheater Aachen
 Westfälisches Landestheater Castrop-Rauxel
 Landestheater Detmold
 
 Rheinisches Landestheater Neuss

Rhineland-Palatinate 

  Neuwied

Saxony 

  Radebeul bei Dresden
  Riesa

Saxony-Anhalt 

  Lutherstadt Eisleben
  Halberstadt/Quedlinburg
 Theater der Altmark Stendal

Schleswig-Holstein 

  Rendsburg

Austria 
List of federal state theatres in Austria.

Lower Austria 
 Landestheater Niederösterreich Sankt Pölten

Salzburg 
 Salzburger Landestheater

Tyrol 
 Tiroler Landestheater Innsbruck

Upper Austria 
 Landestheater Linz

References

Theatre in Germany
Theatre in Austria